Conrad Eugene Van Gent (December 23, 1889 – June 12, 1949) was an American football and basketball player and coach. He served as the head football at the University of Texas at Austin in 1916, at the University Farm, now the University of California, Davis, in 1920, and at Stanford University in 1921, compiling a career college football record of 14–8–3. Van Gent was also the head basketball coach at the University of Missouri (1914–1916), Texas (1916–1917), and Stanford (1921–1922), tallying a career college basketball mark of 42–19. Van Gent played football and basketball, and ran track at the University of Wisconsin–Madison. He was selected to the College Basketball All-American team in 1914.

Coaching career
During his two seasons as basketball head coach at the University of Missouri, from 1914 to 1916, Van Gent led to the Tigers to a 21–9 overall record. The University of Texas hired Van Gent as both football and basketball head coach in 1916. He coached for one season in each sport before joining the military to fight in the World War I. In the 1916 college football season, Van Gent directed Texas to a 7–2 overall record in football and a 6–1 record in Southwest Conference play. As men's basketball head coach for the 1916–17 season, he directed the Longhorns to a 13–3 overall record (7–1 in conference play) and their third consecutive Southwest Conference championship. In 1921, Van Gent coached the Stanford Cardinal football team, compiling a 4–2–2 record. Van Gent also coached Stanford's basketball team in 1921–22. He fell ill with encephalitis lethargica in December 1922 and was hospitalized in San Francisco.

Head coaching record

Football

Basketball

References

External links
 

1889 births
1949 deaths
American men's basketball players
Missouri Tigers men's basketball coaches
Stanford Cardinal men's basketball coaches
Stanford Cardinal football coaches
Texas Longhorns football coaches
Texas Longhorns men's basketball coaches
UC Davis Aggies football coaches
Wisconsin Badgers men's basketball players
Wisconsin Badgers football players
College men's track and field athletes in the United States
All-American college men's basketball players
University of Missouri faculty
People from Ottumwa, Iowa
Coaches of American football from Iowa
Players of American football from Iowa
Basketball coaches from Iowa
Basketball players from Iowa
Track and field athletes from Iowa